Sindhubaadh is a 2019 Indian Tamil-language romantic action thriller film written and directed by S. U. Arun Kumar and jointly produced by S. N. Rajarajan and Shan Sutharsan under their production houses Vansan Movies and K Productions. The film stars Vijay Sethupathi and Anjali the lead roles, while Linga, Vivek Prasanna and Surya Vijay Sethupathi (Sethupathi's son) play supporting roles. Music was composed by Yuvan Shankar Raja, the cinematography was done by Vijay Kartik Kannan and edited by Ruben.

Plot 
Thiru is a small-time crook, who, along with his sidekick Super, steals money and valuables from various people. Thiru's uncle keeps trying to get him to sell the house to earn money, but Thiru repeatedly refuses, leading to some comedy situations. Venba is a loud-talking girl who keeps rejecting all the grooms that her uncle chooses for her, keeping them both at loggerheads. Thiru meets Venba one day and falls in love. Initially, she does not like him, but over time, she reciprocates.

A few days later, she goes to Malaysia for work to earn some money, before which Thiru marries her. She promises Thiru that she will meet him in two days. However, Thiru receives a call from her where she says she needs five lakhs urgently and learns that her uncle had sold her off to the skin trade after that receiving a lump sum of money; she further requests Thiru to come to Thailand to rescue her. Anxious, Thiru finally agrees to sell the house and gets two passports for himself (under the name Hakim Sindhubaadh) and Super (under the name Milan Bharti), and they leave for Thailand.

On the way, they meet a passenger who is going to the same place as them to see his daughter. However, on the way, they get in trouble with the Malaysian police and to rescue Venba, Thiru agrees to steal some shields for the law from Ling's house, a dreaded criminal and second hand for Chang, a Malaysian don. However, he gets caught by Ling and, in a bid to escape, jumps off a cliff while spitting at Ling. Ling swears revenge.

Thiru and Super engage in a cat-and-mouse chase with Ling's henchmen. Meanwhile, because Thiru does not arrive on time, Venba tries to escape but is caught and sent to Ling, which is revealed to Thiru by the police officer. He shows that the reason behind stealing the shields was to gather evidence against Ling. Thiru kills Chang and blows up Ling's house, infuriating Ling further. Finally, Thiru rescues all the girls from the skin trade, kills Ling, and returns to his home with Venba.

Cast 
 Vijay Sethupathi as Thiru (Hakim Sindhubadh) 
 Anjali as Venba
 Linga as Ling
 Vivek Prasanna as Passenger
 Surya Vijay Sethupathi as Super (Milan Bharathi)
 Aruldoss as Support Raja 
 Soundararaja as a politician
 George Maryan as Thiru's uncle
 Chang as a Malaysian don

Production 
The project was announced during March 2018, which revealed that S. U. Arun Kumar is all set to direct another venture that would have Vijay Sethupathi as the protagonist, the project was officially announced sometime during July 2018, which confirmed that this film is all set to enter production soon with the presence of Vijay Sethupathi and actress Anjali, later Yuvan Shankar Raja was on board to compose music for the film. Music in the film will also contain lyrics from Sri Lankan songwriter Rahulraj Nadarajah.

Principal photography commenced on 25 May 2018 at Tenkasi for 20 days, and it was later continued at Thailand with a 32-day long schedule.

Release
The first-look poster for the film was unveiled on 16 January 2019, revealing the title as Sindhubaadh. The satellite rights of the film was bought by Zee Tamil. The release was postponed indefinitely due to Arka Media Works stay on the film due to unpaid dues by S. N. Rajarajan, the co-producer of the film. Finally, the film was released on 27 June 2019.

Soundtrack
The soundtrack was composed by Yuvan Shankar Raja. Music rights were bought by Muzik247.

"Rockstar Robber" (Pav Bundy, ADK Rap Machines) - 3:03
"Nenja Unakkaga" (Haricharan) - 3:29
"Unnalathan" (Al-Rufiyan, Priya Mali) - 3: 19
"Neeyum Naanum" (Santhosh) - 3:59

References 

2019 films
Indian action thriller films
Films scored by Yuvan Shankar Raja
Films shot in Malaysia
2019 action thriller films
2010s Tamil-language films